Přídolí is a market town in Český Krumlov District in the South Bohemian Region of the Czech Republic. It has about 700 inhabitants.

Administrative parts
Villages of Dubová, Práčov, Sedlice, Spolí, Všeměry, Zahořánky and Záluží are administrative parts of Přídolí.

References

Populated places in Český Krumlov District
Market towns in the Czech Republic